The 2007 Southeastern Conference baseball tournament was held at Hoover Metropolitan Stadium in Hoover, AL from May 23 through 27. After being ranked #1 nationally for most of the season and taking the regular-season SEC crown, Vanderbilt won the tournament and earned the Southeastern Conference's automatic bid to the 2007 NCAA Division I baseball tournament.

This year marked the first time since 1984 LSU did not qualify for the tournament. The Bayou Bengals struggled to a 12-17-1 SEC record under first-year coach Paul Mainieri and finished 29-26-1 overall, LSU's lowest win total since 1983, the year before Skip Bertman came to Baton Rouge.

Regular Season Results

Tournament

~ Game was shortened by 10-run rule.
* Game went into extra innings.
LSU, Kentucky, Auburn and Georgia did not make the tournament.

All-Tournament Team

See also
College World Series
NCAA Division I Baseball Championship
Southeastern Conference baseball tournament

References

SECSports.com 2007 Baseball Tournament Results
SECSports.com 2007 Baseball Standings
SECSports.com 2007 All-Tourney Team
2015 SEC Baseball Tournament Attendance @ SECSports.com

Tournament
Southeastern Conference Baseball Tournament
Southeastern Conference baseball tournament
Southeastern Conference baseball tournament
College sports tournaments in Alabama
Baseball competitions in Hoover, Alabama